"Maggie May" is a song by Rod Stewart.

It may also refer to:

"Maggie May" (folk song), a traditional Liverpudlian song performed by The Beatles, and released on the album Let It Be with the spelling "Maggie Mae"
Maggie May (musical), a musical inspired by the song
Maggie May (model), Playboy'''s Miss August 2014
"Maggie May (R.I.P. Faith)", a song by Hieroglyphics from the album Full Circle''